As of September 2016, the International Union for Conservation of Nature (IUCN) lists 329 near threatened reptile species. 6.4% of all evaluated reptile species are listed as near threatened. 
The IUCN also lists two reptile subspecies as near threatened.

Of the subpopulations of reptiles evaluated by the IUCN, two species subpopulations have been assessed as near threatened.

This is a complete list of near threatened reptile species and subspecies evaluated by the IUCN. Species and subspecies which have near threatened subpopulations (or stocks) are indicated.

Turtles and tortoises

Species

Subspecies
Siebenrock's snake-necked turtle (Chelodina rugosa siebenrocki)
Subpopulations
Loggerhead sea turtle (Caretta caretta) (2 subpopulations)

Crocodilia species
Black caiman (Melanosuchus niger)

Lizards
There are 213 lizard species assessed as near threatened.

Diplodactylids

Chameleons

Anoles

Gekkonids

Wall lizards

Skinks

Sphaerodactylids

Neotropical ground lizards

Dragon lizards

Phyllodactylids

Phrynosomatids

Liolaemids

Other lizard species

Snakes
There are 81 species and one subspecies of snake assessed as near threatened.

Pseudoxyrhophiids

Vipers

Dipsadids

Elapids

Colubrids

Keelbacks

Other snakes

Species

Subspecies
Morelia spilota imbricata

See also 
 Lists of IUCN Red List near threatened species
 List of least concern reptiles
 List of vulnerable reptiles
 List of endangered reptiles
 List of critically endangered reptiles
 List of recently extinct reptiles
 List of data deficient reptiles

References 

Reptiles
Near threatened reptiles
Near threatened reptiles
Reptile conservation